The Hamburg Cell is a 2004 British-Canadian television docudrama film produced by Channel 4 and Canadian Broadcasting Corporation, and directed by Antonia Bird. The film describes the creation of the Hamburg cell, Islamist and extremist group composed by the terrorists that piloted the airplanes hijacked during the September 11 attacks. Although the terrorist cell was led by Mohamed Atta, the film is focused on the character of Ziad Jarrah, the one hijacker who had doubts about the attacks and was seen as distinct.

Plot 
The movie shows the events leading up to 9/11 and story of the middle-class students responsible for the 9/11 attack: Ziad Jarrah (Karim Saleh), Mohamed Atta (Kamel), and Ramzi Binalshibh (Omar Berdouni). <div>The film was based on primary research, including personal interviews, unpublished correspondence, and the official 9/11 Commission Report.

Cast 
 Karim Saleh - Ziad Jarrah
 Maral Kamel - Mohammed Atta
 Agni Scott - Aysel
 Omar Berdouni - Ramzi Binalshibh
 Adnan Maral - Marwan al-Shehhi
 Tamer Doghem - Zacarias Moussaoui
 Khalid Laith - Abdulaziz al-Omari

Home media 
A DVD of the film was released on 14 November 2006.

See also 
 United 93, a 2006 film
 World Trade Center, a 2006 film
 Zero Dark Thirty, a 2012 film

References

External links 
 

2004 films
2004 television films
2004 biographical drama films
British biographical drama films
British historical films
Films based on the September 11 attacks
Hamburg cell
2000s historical films
2004 drama films
2000s English-language films
2000s British films
British drama television films